Michael Barratt (born 4 March 1948), known professionally as Shakin' Stevens, is a Welsh singer and songwriter. He was the UK's biggest-selling singles artist of the 1980s. 

His recording and performing career began in the late 1960s, although it was not until 1980 that his commercial success began. His most successful songs were nostalgia hits, evoking the sound of 1950s rock and roll and pop. 

In the UK alone, Stevens has charted 33 Top 40 hit singles including four chart-topping hits "This Ole House", "Green Door", "Oh Julie", and "Merry Christmas Everyone". Aside from "Merry Christmas Everyone" remaining popular during the Christmas season, his last Top 40 single was "Trouble" in 2005.

Early life
Michael Barratt, who would later adopt the stage name "Shakin' Stevens", was the youngest of 11 children born to Jack and May Barratt. His father was a First World War veteran who by 1948 was working in the building trade, having previously worked as a coal miner. The oldest of his siblings was born in the mid-1920s, and by the time of his birth some of Michael Barratt's oldest siblings had already married and started families of their own. Jack Barratt died in 1972 at the age of 75. May Barratt died in 1984 at the age of 83.

He grew up in Ely, Cardiff, and as a teenager, in the mid-1960s he formed his first amateur rock and roll band with school friends and became its vocalist and frontman. Originally named the Olympics, then the Cossacks, the short-lived band finally renamed as the Denims and performed gigs in the local Cardiff and South Wales area. In the late 1960s, Stevens was associated with the Young Communist League (YCL), the youth wing of the Communist Party of Great Britain through playing at YCL events. At the time the YCL was associated with several leading music industry figures, including Pete Townshend. However, Stevens has stated that this was because the individual in charge of booking the band’s gigs was also a member of the organisation.

In the late 1960s his official occupation was a milkman, and he lived in a flat which formed part of an office block in inner-city Cardiff. The office block was demolished several years later.

The Sunsets

Having worked as an upholsterer and milkman, Barratt performed at weekends in clubs and pubs. Having previously followed them as a fan and then as an occasional guest vocalist, Barratt joined the existing Penarth-based the Backbeats – originally formed in 1958 – as lead singer. He was spotted by South Wales impresario Paul "Legs" Barrett, who proposed repackaging the band as a 1950s-influenced rock 'n' roll outfit under a new name. Michael Barratt agreed to choose a stage name, and so borrowing from old school friend Steven Vanderwalker, he chose Shakin' Stevens.

Fronting the newly named Shakin' Stevens and the Sunsets, an early break for the band presented itself when they were given a support slot for the Rolling Stones in December 1969. Despite landing a recording contract with Parlophone Records the following year and releasing a Dave Edmunds-produced album, the optimistically and prematurely titled A Legend, the group found success hard to come by, at least in their native Great Britain, though they had several hit singles in other countries and released three albums on the Dutch Pink Elephant label.  The band toured Germany, Belgium, France and the Netherlands in-between UK dates.

Because they only achieved minor sales, many of the Sunsets' records with Stevens have become collectors' items in the years following his commercial breakthrough; for example a copy of their single "Honey Don't" released in Sweden on CBS Records in 1973 sold for over £340 in 2013. The Sunsets continue to perform, and still tour annually in the UK, Europe and Australia, fronted in recent years by Shaky's nephew, Levi Barratt.

Elvis! and a hit record
In 1977, after seven years of constant touring and recording, "Shaky", as he was also being called by this time, had been spotted during a London Sunsets gig by Jack Good who personally invited him to attend a London audition for his planned new West End musical Elvis!  Three actors were to portray Elvis's life during the course of the show and Shaky landed one of the lead roles, playing Elvis in his prime, charting his army and film star years, with young actor Tim Whitnall covering the earlier formative years and veteran 1960s singer P.J. Proby taking over the part for Elvis's 'Las Vegas' years.

The rest of the Sunsets waited in South Wales, doing occasional performances with drummer Robert 'Rockin Louis' Llewellyn taking the frontman duties, but fully expecting Stevens to return to the band and recommence touring after the show's planned short six-month run. However, the expectations were overtaken by subsequent events. The media-wise Jack Good made sure that both the audition process and the early months of the show were widely and regularly covered by the British daily press and TV shows.

During the Elvis! show's successful and then twice-extended two-year run Shaky made regular TV appearances, firstly on Good's revived British ITV show Oh Boy! and later on his follow-up 30-week-long series Let's Rock that was syndicated in 32 countries, including the United States. This led to his first major chart success with a reworking of the Buck Owens song "Hot Dog", which Owens would re-record using the arrangement created by pedal steel guitar player B.J. Cole.

1980s and 1990s
In late 1979, Stevens signed what was to be his most successful management deal with Freya Miller, who immediately advised Stevens to sever his association with the Sunsets and continue developing a more lucrative solo career. Under Miller's hand, in 1981, Stevens scored his first UK chart-topping number 1 with NRBQ's arrangement of "This Ole House" and would follow up with 10 more songs reaching the top five, including three number 1 hits with "Green Door", "Oh Julie" and "Merry Christmas Everyone", while "You Drive Me Crazy" and "A Love Worth Waiting For" reached number 2 in 1981 and 1984 respectively. His 1984 hit "Teardrops", which reached No. 5 in the UK, featured Hank Marvin on guitar, and since then, Stevens has often featured famous musicians such as Albert Lee, Roger Taylor and Bonnie Tyler on his recordings.

Chart successes also included his album Shaky reaching number 1 on the UK Albums Chart. In the mid-1980s, Stevens re-united with former producer Dave Edmunds to record an album Lipstick, Powder and Paint, and the Christmas smash "Merry Christmas Everyone", which was a number 1 hit in 1985. Its original planned release was put back by a year to avoid clashing with the runaway success of Band Aid's charity single "Do They Know It's Christmas?", to which he did not contribute, having been out of the country touring at the time of recording. 

In a Record Collector magazine feature, writer Kris Griffiths wrote: "This was Shaky at the very zenith of his powers and, perhaps, the breaking-point of marketing overload from which there is only decline. Such concentrated commercial success and ubiquity came with a price."  

Despite Stevens's chart domination over the previous few years, he was not invited to perform at Live Aid on 13 July 1985. The hits continued but chart placings declined throughout the later 1980s and early 1990s. However, Stevens was one of the celebrities to appear in an advertising campaign for Heineken in the late-1980s. The slogan "refreshes the parts other beers cannot reach" was confirmed in the advert as he stops shakin' after consuming the product. 

In the 1990s, Stevens took a lengthy break from recording and was stung by a court ruling that related to unpaid royalties from the Legend album, which had been re-released to some commercial success, requiring a substantial payout to former band members of the Sunsets. In 1999, Stevens returned to performing live and undertook tours all that year and the following year.

2000–present

In January 2002, Stevens was charged with driving while over the alcohol limit and was banned from driving for two years. He was also fined £400. In 2004, he had a further platinum CD-DVD album in Denmark and a gold album in South Africa.

In 2005, Stevens returned once again to the charts in the United Kingdom with his greatest hits album The Collection, which reached the UK top 5. That year, he also appeared in the video to Tony Christie and Peter Kay's No. 1 hit single "Is This the Way to Amarillo", alongside many other UK stars, including: Ronnie Corbett, Jim Bowen and Michael Parkinson. Stevens was the winner on the reality television show, Hit Me Baby One More Time. This was quickly followed by a re-release of his cover and his own biggest hit sung in the show, "Trouble" (covering Pink's version)/"This Ole House", which reached No. 20 on the UK Singles Chart in June 2005, his 33rd Top 40 hit in the United Kingdom.

In April 2008, it was announced that Shakin' Stevens would be performing at 2008's Glastonbury Festival as the opening act on the Pyramid stage on Saturday 28 June, opening the day at 11 am to a capacity crowd.

Chris Evans featured a special Shaky Week on his Radio 2 show during early March 2008 to celebrate Stevens's 60th birthday and later in 2008, Stevens embarked on a string of major concerts in the UK and Europe that started at Lulworth Castle on 4 July. On 24 August 2008, Stevens performed at a major concert in Poland featuring many European pop stars of the 1980s, including Kim Wilde and Limahl. The concert formed a part of the Sopot International Song Festival 2008 and was presented live on the Polish television channel TVN. Stevens followed his European tour with a short tour of Ireland and an appearance at London's O2 Arena, supported by a 10-piece band.

In July 2010, Stevens was rushed to hospital after collapsing at his home in Windsor, reportedly from exhaustion brought on by the stress of working on a new album. It was later revealed that Stevens had suffered a heart attack, which caused him to be hospitalised for two months, after strenuous work gardening at his home.

Stevens fully recovered and, in 2011, he embarked on the early part of his 30th Anniversary Tour, followed by a further 26 dates in the second leg later in the year, backed by a 10-piece band. In 2013 Stevens participated in the family history programme Coming Home and discovered information about the effects of the First World War on his family.

Stevens appeared live on Radio X on 17 December 2015, on The Chris Moyles Show to promote his new Christmas Single "Echoes of a Merry Christmas" with proceeds going to the Salvation Army UK. The original version of the song re-entered the chart in the Top 40.

On 16 September 2016, Stevens released his 12th studio album, Echoes of Our Times. The album was recorded at Berry Hill Studios, produced by Stevens and John David, who also engineered. He then, in 2017, proceeded on a 33-date tour of the UK entitled: The Echoes of Our Time tour, and on Twitter #Echoes.

He performed a concert in Sri Lanka in October 2018, his first show in Asia. That same year, he announced he would be embarking on a new tour of the UK and Europe in early 2019.

A 19x CD anthology 'bookpack' Fire In The Blood was released in November 2020 accompanied by a smaller 54-track 3x CD /26-track 2x LP collection Singled Out. The career-spanning collection was described by Stevens as “the biggest project of my career.”

Personal life
Stevens married Carole Dunn in October 1967, and they divorced in 2009 after 42 years of marriage. They had three children together: two sons, Jason and Dean, and a daughter, Paula. After their divorce, Stevens later began a relationship with his manager Sue Davies and he credits her with saving his life when he suffered a heart attack in July 2010. 

Stevens lives in Marlow, Buckinghamshire. He is a lifelong supporter of Welsh football team Cardiff City.

Discography

References

External links

 
 
 
 Shakin' Stevens biography from BBC Wales

1948 births
Epic Records artists
Living people
Musicians from Cardiff
Welsh rock singers
Welsh male singers
Rockabilly musicians
British rock and roll musicians